Sentelek is a rural locality (a selo) in Senteleksky Selsoviet, Charyshsky District, Altai Krai, Russia. The population was 805 as of 2013. There are 11 streets.

Geography 
Sentelek is located 34 km south of Charyshskoye (the district's administrative centre) by road. Pokrovka is the nearest rural locality.

References 

Rural localities in Tselinny District, Altai Krai